Stanley Thomas Counts (3 July 1926 – 27 January 2015) was a United States Navy admiral whose Cold War military service extended through the Korean War and Vietnam War.

Early life and education
Counts was born 3 July 1926 in Weleetka, Oklahoma. He was a son of Claude and Thelma (Thomas) Counts. He was commissioned as an ensign upon graduation from the United States Naval Academy in June 1949.

Naval career
Following commissioning, Counts reported aboard the destroyer  and later served as combat information officer aboard the attack transport  during the Korean War. He later served as operations officer aboard the escort destroyer  and as executive officer of the destroyer escort . Following graduation from the Naval Postgraduate School in 1955 with a Master of Science degree in engineering electronics, Counts was the ship commissioning executive officer of the destroyer  and served in that capacity through the Cuban Missile Crisis. He subsequently was the ship commissioning commanding officer of the destroyer escort . After receipt of a Bronze Star Medal with "V" device for rescuing a downed pilot from Haiphong Harbor while commanding the destroyer  during the Vietnam War, Counts became the first project manager for the NATO RIM-7 Sea Sparrow program. He was promoted to rear admiral after commanding the cruiser  through its 4th PIRAZ deployment. He then served as the last commander of the Naval Ordnance Systems Command prior to its merger into the Naval Sea Systems Command and commanded Cruiser-Destroyer Group 5 until he retired from active duty in 1979.

Tonkin Gulf experience
Captain Counts was commanding USS Towers on an August night when his shipboard radar indicated what appeared to be surface contacts similar to those reported in the same area during the Tonkin Gulf incident two years earlier.  Darkness prevented visual confirmation as the ships on PIRAZ and nearby search and rescue (SAR) stations maneuvered to defend against possible torpedo boat attack.  The radar echoes abruptly disappeared when USS Towers fired a star shell to illuminate the area.  Officers evaluated the situation as flocks of cormorant which dispersed when startled by the star shell.  The official report of the event received limited distribution to avoid embarrassing President Lyndon B. Johnson.

Ships commanded by Captain Counts

Later life
Counts was employed through the first decade of his retirement from naval service by Hughes Aircraft Company as assistant division manager for engineering services and support and as manager for the spares program office within the Ground Systems Group in Fullerton, California. He was active with San Diego civic organizations until passing away from complications of Alzheimer's disease in 2015.

Awards
Counts' awards include:
 Legion of Merit (3)
 Bronze Star Medal with "V" device
 American Campaign Medal
 World War II Victory Medal
 Navy Occupation Service Medal with Europe clasp
 Navy Expeditionary Medal
 China Service Medal
 National Defense Service Medal with bronze star
 Korean Service Medal with bronze star
 United Nations Service Medal
 Armed Forces Expeditionary Medal
 Vietnam Service Medal with two bronze stars
 Republic of Vietnam Campaign Medal with device

References

1926 births
2015 deaths
United States Navy admirals
United States Navy personnel of the Korean War
United States Navy personnel of the Vietnam War
Military personnel from Oklahoma